Loren Terveen is an American computer scientist and was the president of the Association for Computing Machinery's SIGCHI professional group from 2015 to 2018. Terveen is a professor of computer science and engineering and studies human-computer interaction at GroupLens Research at the University of Minnesota.

In 2008, Terveen and colleagues created Cyclopath, a path recommender system for cyclists in Minneapolis-Saint Paul, Minnesota. Terveen co-authored the article "Evaluating collaborative filtering recommender systems", which has been cited almost four thousand times in scientific research.

In 2023, Terveen received SIGCHI's Lifetime Service Award.

Terveen's family is from Emery, South Dakota. He now lives in Minneapolis, Minnesota.

References

External links
 

American computer scientists
Year of birth missing (living people)
Living people
University of Minnesota faculty